Bong Tae-gyu (born 19 May 1981) is a South Korean actor.

Filmography

Film

Television series

Television show

Hosting

Radio shows

Music video appearances

Theater

Awards and nominations

References

External links 
 Bong Tae-gyu Fan Cafe at Daum 
 
 
 
 

South Korean male film actors
South Korean male television actors
South Korean male stage actors
1981 births
Living people